Lachlan Ash (born 21 June 2001) is an Australian rules footballer who plays for the Greater Western Sydney Giants in the Australian Football League (AFL). He was recruited by the Greater Western Sydney Giants with the 4th draft pick in the 2019 AFL draft.

Early football
Ash was born in Katandra he participated in the Auskick program there and played junior football in Katandra Football Club and senior football at the Shepparton Football Club. Ash represented Vic Country at the AFL Under 18 Championships for the 2018 and 2019 seasons. He also played for the Murray Bushrangers for two seasons in the NAB League.

AFL career
Ash debuted in the Giants' twenty-four point loss against the Western Bulldogs in the third round of the 2020 AFL season. Ash collected seven disposals and three marks. Ash took home the club's rising star award at the conclusion of the season. Ash had a career-best game in his team's 39 point loss to rivals  in the 6th round of the 2021 AFL season, where he collected 35 disposals and 15 marks to be one of the ' best on ground that game.

Statistics
Statistics are correct to round 6, 2021

|- style="background:#EAEAEA"
| scope="row" text-align:center | 2020
| 
| 7 || 12 || 1 || 0 || 79 || 57 || 136 || 31 || 22 || 0.1 || 0 || 6.6 || 4.8 || 11.3 || 3.6 || 2.9
|- 
| scope="row" text-align:center | 2021
| 
| 7 || 6 || 0 || 0 || 102 || 41 || 143 || 46 || 10 || 0.0 || 0.0 || 17.0 || 6.8 || 23.8 || 7.7 || 1.7
|- style="background:#EAEAEA; font-weight:bold; width:2em"
| scope="row" text-align:center class="sortbottom" colspan=3 | Career
| 18
| 1
| 0
| 181
| 98
| 279
| 77
| 32
| 0.1
| 0.0
| 10.1
| 5.4
| 15.5
| 4.3
| 1.8
|}

References

External links
 
 
 

2001 births
Living people
Greater Western Sydney Giants players
Australian rules footballers from Victoria (Australia)
Murray Bushrangers players
People from Shepparton
[Category:Auskick participants]]